The 2016–17 Spartan South Midlands Football League season was the 20th in the history of Spartan South Midlands Football League, a football competition in England.

Premier Division

The Premier Division featured 19 clubs which competed in the division last season, along with three new clubs: 
 Crawley Green, promoted from Division One
 Edgware Town, promoted from Division One
 Leighton Town, relegated from the Southern Football League

League table

Division One

Division One featured 21 club in the division for this season, of which there are five new clubs:
 Bedford, relegated from the Premier Division
 Biggleswade, new club
 Hadley Wood & Wingate, joined from the Herts County League
 Harefield United, relegated from the Premier Division
 Kensington Borough, promoted from Division Two, with a name change from AFC Hillgate

League table

Division Two

Division Two featured twelve clubs which competed in the division last season, along with six new clubs:
Enfield Borough, new club
MK Gallacticos, joined from the North Bucks & District League
New Bradwell St Peter, demoted from Division One
St Neots Town reserves
Thame Rangers, joined from the Wycombe & District League
Tring Town, new club

Also, Wolverton Town changed name to Unite MK.

League table

References

2016-17
9